Keith Edward Otterbein (born May 19, 1957) is an American football coach He is the head football coach at Hillsdale College, a position he has held since the 2002 season. From 1986 to 1994, Otterbein served as the head football coach at Ferris State University.

Head coaching record

References

External links
 Hillsdale profile

1957 births
Living people
American football linebackers
Ball State Cardinals football coaches
Central Michigan Chippewas football coaches
Ferris State Bulldogs football coaches
Hillsdale Chargers football coaches
Hillsdale Chargers football players